Gustavo Badell (born August 1, 1968) is a Uruguayan former football player. He played for clubs in Uruguay, Paraguay, Chile and Ecuador.

Personal life
He is the father of international footballer Yamila Badell.

Honours and achievements 
Colo-Colo
 Primera División: 1998

References

External links
 Profile at BDFA 

1968 births
Living people
Uruguayan people of Catalan descent
Uruguayan footballers
Uruguayan expatriate footballers
Club Nacional de Football players
Central Español players
Huracán Buceo players
Rampla Juniors players
Danubio F.C. players
C.A. Bella Vista players
Centro Atlético Fénix players
C.S. Emelec footballers
Colo-Colo footballers
Club Olimpia footballers
Expatriate footballers in Chile
Expatriate footballers in Ecuador
Expatriate footballers in Paraguay

Association football defenders